"I Will Never Leave You" is a 1992 song recorded by the Australian act Euphoria. The track was released in November 1992 as the fourth and final single from their debut studio album, Total Euphoria. The track peaked at number 41 on the ARIA Charts. It would also be the group's last top 50 charting single in Australia, and member Holly Garnett's final performance with the group. Garnett was replaced by Jodie Meares, who appeared in the music video for the song, and whose brief membership in the group would end with the act breaking up in 1993.

Track listing
Australian CD Single:
 "I Will Never Leave You" (3:56)
 "Do for You" (US Ultimix 12") (6:55)
 "Love You Right" (UK Gat Decor 12") (6:59)

Charts

References

External links
Music video from YouTube

Euphoria (Australian band) songs
1992 songs
1992 singles
EMI Records singles
Songs written by Andrew Klippel